Taupō District Council  is a territorial authority that administers the Taupō District in the Central North Island of New Zealand. The district stretches from the small town of Mangakino in the northwest to the Tongariro National Park in the south, and east into the Kaingaroa Forest, covering 6,970 km2 (including Lake Taupō). It had a population of

Regional councils
The district falls within the jurisdiction of four different regional councils; however the vast majority (73.74% by land area) of the district falls within the jurisdiction of Environment Waikato. The exceptions are the towns of Rangitaiki (14.31% of the district's land area), which lies within the Bay of Plenty region, Taharua (11.26%), which lies within the Hawke's Bay Region, and Te More (0.69%), which lies within the Manawatū-Whanganui region. Taupō is unique in being the only district in New Zealand so divided; no other district is divided between/among more than two regions, and most are not divided at all.

Wards
The Taupō District has five wards – Taupō, Taupō East Rural, Turangi-Tongariro, Mangakino and the new Te Papamārearea Māori ward – and is represented by the Mayor and twelve councillors.

Taupō
The areas of Taupō and Kaingaroa are administered by the Taupō District Council.

Taupō East Rural

Mangakino-Pouakani

The areas of Mangakino and Pouakani are administered by the Taupō District Council. The area is also represented by the Mangakino Pouakani Representation Group which has a total of six members including three Councillors.

Turangi-Tongariro
The areas of Turangi and Tongariro are administered by the Taupō District Council. The area is represented at Council by one district Councillor. 

Following the October 2022 local election, the Tūrangi-Tongariro Community Board (TTCB) was replaced with ward representation from one councillor, and a district-wide Māori ward, Te Papamārearea, with two councillors.

The area will also be supported by a Mana Whakahono a Rohe, a partnership agreement between Taupō District Council and Ngāti Tūrangitukua, the Ngāti Tūwharetoa hapū which holds mana whenua over Tūrangi township. As part of the Mana Whakahono, an equal co-governance committee made up of both Ngāti Tūrangitukua and council appointees will be set up.

To ensure the wider Tongariro area is also fairly represented, a representative group will be established by council and delegated the powers and functions previously held by the TTCB for that area.

Council
The Taupō District has 12 councillors and a mayor.

Mayor
The office of mayor of Taupō was established in 1989 as part of the 1989 local government reforms. Since 2013, the mayor of Taupō has been David Trewavas.

Deputy Mayor
Taupō District deputy mayor is Kevin Taylor. Cr Kevin Taylor was formally appointed to the role of Deputy Mayor on 28 October 2022.

Councillors

Taupō ward
Cr Kevin Taylor (Deputy Mayor)
Cr Duncan Campbell
Cr Anna Park 
Cr Christine Rankin
Cr Rachel Shepherd
Cr Yvonne Westerman
Cr John Williamson

Taupō East Rural ward
Cr Kylie Leonard

Mangakino ward
Cr Kirsty Trueman

Turangi-Tongariro ward
Cr Sandra Greenslade

Te Papamārearea Māori ward
Cr Karam Fletcher 
Cr Danny Loughlin

References

External links
Taupō District Council

Taupō District
Territorial authorities of New Zealand